The Kirk's blenny (Alticus kirkii) is a species of combtooth blenny (family Blenniidae) in the genus Alticus. It was described by A. Günther in 1964, originally as a member of the genus Salarias. It is a tropical blenny which is known from the Red Sea, Mozambique, Réunion, the Persian Gulf, and India, in the Indian ocean. Kirk's blennies inhabit waters near the shore, and often spend time out of the water. They are able to breathe air when on land. They are oviparous, and form distinct pairs when mating; they also guard their eggs. They can reach a maximum total length of 11 centimetres (4.33 inches), and feed primarily off of benthic algae.

The common name and the specific name honour the Scottish doctor, naturalist and explorer John Kirk (1832-1922) who collected the type of this species and gave it to the British Museum (Natural History).

References

External links
 Alticus kirkii at WoRMS
 Alticus kirkii at ITIS
 Skin Characteristics and Organization of the Air-breathing Fish, Alticus kirkii (Gnther, 1868) along Different Body Regions Ahmed S.A. Harabawy; Imam A.A. Mekkawy, 2011. Journal of Biological Sciences  
Alticus kirkii at www.fishwise.co.za.

Kirk's blenny
Fish described in 1868
Taxa named by Albert Günther